Fettes may refer to:

 Fettes College, a private school in Edinburgh, Scotland
 , a German hip-hop group
 Fettesian-Lorettonian Club, Sports Club

People with the surname
 Christopher Fettes (born 1937), English-born Irish teacher and social activist
 Ian Dundas Fettes (born 1945), NZ-born genealogist
 William Fettes (1750-1836), Sir William Fettes, First Baronet, Scottish businessman and philanthropist

See also
 Vettese, another variant of the name
 Fiddes

Scottish surnames